This is a list of notable Sudanese people.

Academics and science 

 Ali M. El-Agraa (born 1941), economist
 Mohamed Osman Baloola (born 1981), biomedical engineer who works on diabetes monitoring
 Mamoun Beheiry (1925–2002), economist, president of the African Development Bank and twice finance minister
 Nashwa Eassa (born 1980), nano-particle physicist
 Ismail El Gizouli, acting president of the IPCC
 Mohamed H.A. Hassan (born 1947), mathematician and physicist
 Daoud Mustafa Khalid, neurologist
 Awn Alsharif Qasim, (1933–2006), writer, educator, encyclopedist
 Khalida Zahir (1927–2015), physician

Businesspeople 

 Mo Ibrahim, businessman
 Osama Daoud , businessman

Entertainment

 Mohammed al Amin, musician
Alsarah, Sudanese-American singer
Bangs, South Sudanese hip hop artist
 Bas, Sudanese-American rapper
 Ramey Dawoud, Sudanese-American Hip hop artist and actor
Lordboy Cmt, South Sudanese music producer 
 Ajak Deng, model
Ataui Deng, model
Emmanuel Jal, South Sudanese musician
Abdel Karim al Kabli, singer
Abdel Aziz El Mubarak singer
 Oddisee, rapper
Natasja Saad, rapper
Abdel Gadir Salim, singer
Alexander Siddig, actor
 Mohammed Wardi, singer
 Alek Wek, model and designer
 Zanib, musician and activist

Historical figures

 Al Khalifa Abdullah, leader during Mahdia era
 Al-Mahdi, religious leader during Mahdia era

Literature

 Abdalla Eltayeb, scholar of the Arabic language, wrote a detailed primer on approaching ancient and medieval Arabic poetry.
 Tayeb Salih, novelist and prolific writer (The Wedding of Zein, Season of Migration to the North)
 Ibrahim 'Ali Salman, famous poet from Dar al-Manasir
 Safia Elhillo, Sudanese-American poet

Media

 Zeinab Badawi, Sudanese-British television and radio reporter and news presenter at BBC News
Nima Elbagir: award-winning senior international correspondent for CNN based in London
Yousra Elbagir, Sudanese-British journalist, writing for CNN, BBC, Channel 4 
Nesrine Malik: opinion columnist at The Guardian
 Alfred Taban, journalist, founder of Khartoum Monitor newspaper

Politics and government

 Lam Akol, foreign affairs minister and former lecturer at University of Khartoum
 Abdallah Muhammed at-Tom, elected to Sudan’s first House of Representatives 
 Ismail al-Azhari, former Prime Minister and first Head of State of Sudan, oversaw the independence of Sudan in 1956
 Abdallah Bakr Mustafa, nazir of Gedaref and member of the Legistlative Assembly between 1948 and 1953
 Rashid Bakr, former Prime Minister
 Omar al-Bashir, former President of Sudan
 Mandour Elmahdi, former Principal of the Institute of Education in Sudan
 Osman Eltayeb, Honorary Consul of Sudan in Nigeria and CPA participant
 John Garang, former Vice President and Sudan peace signer
 Sayed Ahmad Keir, second Foreign Minister of Sudan, 1958–1964
 Yousif Kuwa (1945–2001) revolutionary, rebel commander and politician
 Mariam al-Mahdi, Foreign Minister of Sudan
 Sadiq al-Mahdi (1935–2020) former Prime Minister of Sudan
 Salva Kiir Mayardit, Vice President of Sudan
 Minni Minnawi, leader of largest faction of Sudan Liberation Army
 Ahmed al-Mirghani, former Head of State of Sudan
 Abd ul-Hamid Musa Madibbo, representative from Nyala Baggara East
 Field Marshal Gaafar Nimeiry, fourth President of Sudan
 Hassan Al-Turabi, scholar and thinker who helped initiate and establish the Islamic movement in the Sudan.
 Abdalla Hamdok, current prime minister of Sudan.

Humanitarians 

Emtithal Mahmoud, poet, activist
Hajja Kashif Badri, women's right activist
 Dalia Haj-Omar, human rights activist
Hadeel Ibrahim, philanthropist
Fatima Talib Ismaeil, women's right activist
 Maha Jaafar, social activist on Social media
 Amin Mekki Medani, human rights lawyer
 Nahid Toubia, physician and activist for gender equality
Salva Dut, Founder and President of Water for South Sudan, Inc.

Religious figures 

 Al-Mahdi, religious leader

Sports

 Nagmeldin Ali Abubakr, athlete
 Yamilé Aldama, triple jumper
 Manute Bol, former NBA basketball player and activist
 Luol Deng, NBA basketball player
 Deng Gai, former NBA player
 Ismail Ahmed Ismail, athlete
 Hassan El Kashief, retired athlete
 Omer Khalifa, retired athlete who set a national record over 1500 metres in Grosseto in 1986
John Mirona, Olympic boxer
 Todd Matthews-Jouda, athlete
 Haitham Mustafa, footballer

See also 

 List of Sudanese writers
 List of African writers by country

Sudanese